Andriasa mitchelli is a moth of the  family Sphingidae. It is known from Malawi.

References

Smerinthini
Moths described in 1973
Fauna of Zambia
Moths of Africa